Shaker High School, is a public high school in Latham, Albany County, New York, United States, and is the only high school operated by the North Colonie Central School District.

The school's Science Bowl team finished first in their regional competition in 2020 earning trips to the national competition in Washington, DC.

It is part of the North Colonie Central Schools school district and is fed in part by (name change) Shaker Middle School.

Sports
There are 28 interscholastic sports at Shaker. Shaker's "Blue Bison" sports teams include soccer, basketball, track, cross country, golf, ice hockey, wrestling, field hockey, lacrosse, swimming, diving, gymnastics, tennis, cheerleading, softball, volleyball, bowling, football, and baseball. Shaker also has several club teams, including Shaker Crew, the rowing team.

Music 
Shaker High School has several curricular band, orchestra, chorus, and wind ensembles. Shaker also has four extracurricular vocal performance groups, including Shaker Select, and several select instrumental ensembles, including Counterpoint Strings Dixieland Jazz, Pep Band, and Marching Band.

Notable alumni

Mike Campese, guitarist and composer who was part of the Trans-Siberian Orchestra
Leah Dickerman, Curator of Painting and Sculpture at the Museum of Modern Art (MoMA) in New York City
Paul Elie, former Farrar, Straus & Giroux editor; and author.
James H. Fallon, American neuroscientist, Fulbright, NIH, and Sloan Scholar
Joseph Finder, thriller author
Marina Shafir, Moldovan professional wrestler and mixed martial artist
Jeff Hoffman, baseball player for the Cincinnati Reds
Tommy Kahnle, baseball pitcher for the Los Angeles Dodgers
Sam Perkins, former professional basketball player, NCAA Champion  and Olympic Gold Medalist 
Becca Rausch, member of the Massachusetts State Senate, from the Norfolk, Middlesex, and Bristol districts. 
Igor Vamos, member of The Yes Men
Deborah Van Valkenburgh, actress; co-star of the TV sitcom Too Close for Comfort and the film The Warriors, among others
Madison VanDenburg, finalist in Season 17 of American Idol
Ron Vawter, actor, Obie Award recipient, and founding member of The Wooster Group
Kevin M. Warsh, former member, Federal Reserve Board of Governors, Washington, DC and brother of Alexandra Steele (née Kate Warsh)
Jason West, mayor of New Paltz, New York
Tony Wise, former NFL assistant coach

References

External links 

1958 establishments in New York (state)
Educational institutions established in 1958
Public high schools in Albany County, New York